WGHR (106.3 MHz) is an FM radio station broadcasting Westwood One's Good Time Oldies format. Licensed to Spring Hill, Florida, United States, it serves the northern Tampa Bay area, including Hernando and Citrus Counties. The station is currently owned by WGUL-FM, Inc. (named after the station's former call sign; see WGUL).

History
The station went on the air on 97.1 MHz as WEOA on 1989-10-31. On 1990-01-05, the station changed its call sign to WPDS and on August 14, 1992, to WXOF.

As WXOF, then a country music-formatted station, the station would swap frequencies in 1998 with Holiday-based WLVU-FM 106.3 (now WSUN), in order for the latter station to get a stronger signal in the Tampa Bay area.

At 106.3 MHz, on January 11, 1999, the station changed its call sign to WGUL-FM and format to the Music of Your Life, and on January 1, 2005, the calls changed to WJQB.

On May 27, 2014, WJQB relaunched as "Hits 106". The station changed to its current WGHR call sign on June 1, 2014. On May 5, 2015, WGHR shifted its format from oldies to classic hits.

References

External links

GHR
Classic hits radio stations in the United States
Radio stations established in 1989
1989 establishments in Florida